Calliotropis crystalophora is a species of sea snail, a marine gastropod mollusk in the family Eucyclidae.

Description
The shell can grow to 4.5 mm.

Distribution
It's found in the Southwest Pacific from New Caledonia to Tonga.

Its type locality is southeast of Raoul Island, Kermadec Islands.

References

crystalophora
Gastropods described in 1979